The 4th Supply Battalion is a battalion of the United States Marine Corps Reserve that specializes in distributing and warehousing military goods and equipment. Headquartered in Newport News, Virginia, they fall under the command of the 4th Marine Logistics Group and Marine Forces Reserve.

Subordinate units

 Headquarters and Service Company, Newport News, Virginia
 Medical Logistics Company, Charleston, South Carolina 
 Ammunition Company, Greenville, South Carolina
 Detachment 1, Ammunition Company, Rome, Georgia
 General Support Company, Topeka, Kansas
 Supply Company, Raleigh, North Carolina
 Detachment 1, Supply Company, Albany, Georgia
 Rations Company, Washington, D.C.

Mission
To field, train, and provide qualified supply augmentees and capabilities to the active component; to serve as a Combat Logistics Regiment (CLR) headquarters when tasked; to serve as the force intermediate supply activity for designated classes of supply.

History
Activated 20 March 1952 at Norfolk, Virginia as 1st Depot Supply Battalion, U.S. Marine Corps Reserve.

Redesignated 1 November 1959 as 3D Service Battalion, U.S. Marine Corps Reserve.

Redesignated 1 February 1961 as 1st Combat Service Support Battalion, U.S. Marine Corps Reserve.

Redesignated 1 July 1962 as Material Supply and Maintenance Battalion, 4th Force Service Regiment, Force Troops, Fleet Marine Force, U.S. Marine Corps Reserve.

Redesignated 1 July 1965 as Supply Battalion, 4th Force Service Regiment.

Relocated during October 1971 to Newport News, Virginia.

Redesignated 17 May 1976 as 4th Supply Battalion, 4th Force Service Support Group.

Participated in support of Operations Desert Shield and Desert Storm, Southwest Asia, December 1990 – February 1991.

Mobilized and Deployed to Camp Pendleton, California in support of Operations Enduring Freedom and Iraqi Freedom, Iraq February – September 2003.

See also

History of the United States Marine Corps
List of United States Marine Corps battalions

References

 4th Supply Battalion's official website

4th Marine Logistics Group
Logistics battalions of the United States Marine Corps